The 2008–09 season was Maccabi Haifa's 51st season in Israeli Premier League, and their 27th consecutive season in the top division of Israeli football.

The season was a great success for the club winning the league and coming extremely close to winning the State Cup to go with it.

Liga Al

State Cup

Toto Cup

Group stage

Knockout stage

Squad statistics

References

Maccabi Haifa F.C. seasons
Maccabi Haifa